The Basilica Saint-Sauveur in Rennes (French: basilique Saint-Sauveur de Rennes) is a minor basilica of the Roman Catholic Church, known as Our Lady of Miracles and Virtues (in French: Notre-Dame des Miracles et Vertus), located in the heart of the historic city center of Rennes in France. It was founded under the name of Saint-Sauveur before the 11th century. Expanded several times and rebuilt in the early 18th century, it was the seat of a parish for nearly three hundred years, until the Second World War, and again from 2002. Following several events described as miraculous in the 14th and 18th centuries, the cult of Mary developed strongly, culminating in its erection as a basilica in 1916. The building is classical in style and is particularly noteworthy for its furnishings: the baldachin of the high altar, the wrought iron pulpit, the organ, as well as the numerous ex-votos left by the faithful.

References 

Roman Catholic cathedrals in France
Buildings and structures in Rennes
Churches in Ille-et-Vilaine